The 2009 Al-Fateh Confederations Futsal Cup, being the first Futsal Confederations Cup, was held in Libya from 6 to 11 October 2009. The draw was held on 4 October 2009 in Tripoli. After Spain withdrew on 3 October, it was decided to be a single group competition. Iran won the tournament after winning all their matches.

Participating teams

Referees 

  Tawfiq Al-Dawi
  Ahmed Fitouri
  Mohammed Obeid
  Shams al-Din Allmty
  Abd-Alaali Alzeidani
  Angulo Chataao
  Francisco Rivera Llerenas
  Hector Asturado
  Edi Sunjc
  Karel Henych

Tournament

Matches

Standings

Honors 

Best Player:  Vahid Shamsaei
Best Goalkeeper:  Mohammed Al-Sharif
Top Goal Scorer:  Elliot Ragomo
Fair-Play Team:

References

Futsal Confederations Cup
F
2009
2009–10 in Libyan football
2009–10 in Iranian futsal
2009–10 in Guatemalan football
2009–10 in Uruguayan football
2009 in Solomon Islands sport